In August 1874, the Italian government foiled an insurrectionary plot by Bakuninist anarchists in Bologna, Italy.

Planning 

Anarchist Mikhail Bakunin plotted an insurrection in Italy to hasten an uprising that he and his adherents felt was already imminent with declining economic conditions. Carlo Cafiero purchased 250 rifles and pistols in preparation for the uprising. Bakunin and Cafiero created a national plan of action with Andrea Còsta and Errico Malatesta. They invisioned spontaneous revolutionary uprisings across the country, extending from Bologna. Cafiero wrote a propaganda statement heralding redemption for Italian peasants. Còsta was the head organizer and Bakunin would lead the Bologna insurrection.

Arrest and aftermath 

The Italian government, with advanced notice from peasants who rejected the Bakuninsts, easily arrested Còsta before the insurrection could begin. Bakunin, disguised as a priest, fled Italy, and the other leaders were jailed. It was a major setback to the Italian anarchist movement.

Cafiero missed the failed insurrection, having been in Russia arranging to marry the revolutionary Olimpia Kutusov since earlier in the year. While the marriage was to grant her Western asylum, rather than for love, her detention as a subversive complicated his action. The failure of the insurrection strained his otherwise highly favorable relationship with Bakunin.

References

Bibliography 

 
 

August 1874 events
Conflicts in 1874
1874 in Italy
Mikhail Bakunin
Anarchism in Italy
History of Bologna